Mixed team

Charles Haberkorn (November 16, 1880 – November 1966)  was an American tug of war competitor and wrestler who competed in the 1904 Summer Olympics.

In the 1904 Olympics he won a bronze medal as a member of Southwest Turnverein of Saint Louis No. 2 team, which is officially considered a mixed team.

As wrestler he competed in the freestyle lightweight category and was eliminated in the quarterfinals. He was born in Württemberg, Germany and died in St. Louis, Missouri.

Notes

External links
profile

19th-century births
1966 deaths
People from the Kingdom of Württemberg
German emigrants to the United States
Olympic bronze medalists for the United States in tug of war
Olympic tug of war competitors of the United States
Olympic wrestlers of the United States
Tug of war competitors at the 1904 Summer Olympics
Wrestlers at the 1904 Summer Olympics
American male sport wrestlers
Medalists at the 1904 Summer Olympics
Date of death missing
Sportspeople from St. Louis